Diocese of Edmonton may refer to:

Anglican Diocese of Edmonton
Roman Catholic Archdiocese of Edmonton